This is a list of airports served by Avianca.

See also
List of Avianca Brasil destinations
List of Avianca Costa Rica destinations
List of Avianca Ecuador destinations
List of Avianca El Salvador destinations
List of Avianca Perú destinations

References

Lists of airline destinations
Destinations
Star Alliance destinations